The Argentina national korfball team formed in 2011 is managed by the Asociación de Korfball Argentina (AKA) representing Argentina in korfball international competitions.

Tournament History
Argentina were scheduled to compete in the First Pan-American Korfball Championship, but withdrew from the final competition due to financial reasons and were subsequently replaced by a second Brazil team who played their matches out of the Championship.

References

National korfball teams
Korfball
Korfball in Argentina